Anthony Charles "Tony" Foottit (born 28 June 1935) was the Bishop of Lynn from 1999 to 2003.

Footrit was educated at Lancing College and King's College, Cambridge. Ordained in 1961, he was a curate at Wymondham, after which he was vicar of Blakeney, Rural Dean of Cary and finally, before his ordination to the episcopate, the Archdeacon of Lynn (1987–1999). A keen botanist, he is married with three children.

References

1935 births
People educated at Lancing College
Alumni of King's College, Cambridge
20th-century Church of England bishops
21st-century Church of England bishops
Living people
Bishops of Lynn
Archdeacons of Lynn